Big Gay Out is the name of an LGBT festival in New Zealand. The longer-running Big Gay Out is a non-profit LGBT fair day in Auckland, New Zealand. The Big Gay Out has been running since 2000 and is usually organised and run by the New Zealand AIDS Foundation.  In this fair Mr Gay New Zealand World is also chosen.

Line-ups and attendees

Hero Festival Big gay out 2003 
An estimated of 8000 - 10,000 were in attendance at the 16 February 2003 Big Gay Out.

Ansell Big gay out 2004 
An estimated of 10,000 were in attendance at the 8 February 2004 Big Gay Out.

Hero Festival Big gay out 2006 
Acts on stage at the 13 February 2006 Big Gay Out included bands and solo artists, dance performers:
 Miss K
 Miss Buckwheat
 Mahinārangi Tocker
 The Morrisons

Hero Festival Big gay out 2007 
Acts on stage at the 2007 Big Gay Out included bands and solo artists, dance performers:
 Boyband
 Mahinārangi Tocker
 Kneel Halt
 Buffy and Bimbo

An estimate of 12,000 people attended the 11 February 2007 Big Gay Out.

Hero Festival Big gay out 2008 
Acts on stage at the 2008 Big Gay Out included bands and solo artists, dance performers:
 Miss Buckwheat 
 Cindy of Samoa
 Pulse

An estimate of 6000 - 7000 Attended the 10 February 2008 Big Gay Out. The event was at its lowest due to poor weather.

NZAF Big gay out 2009 
Acts on stage at the 8 February 2009 Big Gay Out included bands and solo artists, dance performers:
 Razor
 Queenie
 Cindy Of Samoa

An estimate of 10,000 People attended the 8 February 2009 Big Gay Out.

Get It On! Big gay out 2010 
Acts on stage at the 14 February 2010 Big Gay Out included bands and solo artists, dance performers, and stand-up comedians:
 Sarah Lambourne (Flirt)
 Opening Karakia
 NZ Quilt Project
 Tess Tickle
 Dykes on Bikes
 The Aroha Festival Launch!
 Get it on! with your significant others
 Kids & Dogs
 Ramon
 Steven Oates
 Finale Restaurant & Cabaret
 Urzila (comedian)
 Beaver Brown
 Larry - 'Signing' Singer
 Jock Swap & Underwear models
 Caluzzi Bar & Cabaret
 Sheba Withers
 Tug of War
 Brittany
 Manu Dolls
 LA Thompson & Christ Barclay
 Cindy of Samoa
 Olaf & Keishia - 'U Want Me'
 Razor
 Will C Barling & sexy DJ Stevolicious
 Annie Crummer 
Beenie Man was supposed to be one of many performers at the 2010 Big Day Out, a different event, but he was pulled from the lineup in 2009 due controversial, anti-gay lyrics, including "I'm dreaming of a new Jamaica, come to execute all the gays." Despite Beenie Man's efforts to stay in the lineup, Big Day Out management decided that it would be best for the festival if his performance was removed.

An estimate of 12,000 people attended the 14 February 2010 Big Gay Out.

Get It On! Big gay out 2011 
The 13 February 2011 Big Gay Out had performances spanning from 12:00pm until 7:00pm, including:
 Anika Moa

An estimate of over 10,000 people attended the 13 February 2011 Big Gay Out.

Get It On! Big gay out 2012 
The 12 February 2012 Big Gay Out had performances spanning from 12:00pm until 7:00pm, including:
 Zowie
 Te Roopu Kapahaka o Hokianga 
 Lorraine Butler 
 Sheree Waitoa 
 Finale Cabaret 
 Pearls of Meganesianz 
 Ngaire & Noreen 
 Caluzzi Girls 
 Kamp David 
 D’mynority 
 DNA Spectacular 
 Titch Marvel & the Paparazzi Dolls 
 Razor 
 Manthyng 
 Petra and her Poi Mob 
 Andreas Derleth winning the Mr Gay New Zealand title held at the Big Gay Out, who went on to win Mr Gay World
 Prime Minister John Key

An estimate of over 14,000 people attended the 11 February 2012 Big Gay Out.

Get It On! Big gay out 2013 
The 10 February 2013 Big Gay Out had performances spanning from 12:00pm until 7:00pm, including:
 Kids of 88
 Brooke Duff
 Maree Sheehan

An estimate of over 15,000 people attended the 10 February 2013 Big Gay Out.

Love Your Condom Big gay out 2014 
Performers and attendees at the 9 February 2014 Big Gay Out included:
 African Rhumba & Kwasa Kwasa
 Ale Abud Held
 Sonic Delusion
 Mika X & The Aroha Project
 Willie & Raymond
 Sharvelle Charlotte
 Charlotte Yates
 Diamonds of Paradise
 Fine Fatale
 Kittens of the Internet
 L.O.V.E
 Family Bar Dragalicious
 Lavina Williams
 Legend Bar Showcase
 LACE
 Buckwheat & Tess Tickle
Urzila Carlson
 Caluzzi Girls
 Good Short
 Cindy of Samoa 

An estimate of 15,000 people attended the 9 February 2014 Big Gay Out.

Love Your Condom Big gay out 2015 
The 8 February 2015 Big Gay Out had performances spanning from 12:00pm until 7:00pm, including:
 Lavina Williams
 Emily Williams
 J. Williams
 Brooke Duff
 Pieter T
 K.One

An estimate of 12,000 - 15,000 people attended 8 February 2015. 20,000 condoms were distributed to the attendees and 209 people were tested for HIV.

Love Your Condom Big gay out 2016 
The 15 February 2016 Big Gay Out had performances spanning from 12:00pm until 7:00pm, including:
 Ahakoa Te Aha
 Anita Wigl'it and Kita Mean
 Rowan and Travis
 Drag King Performance
 TAPAC - Night of the Queer
 Alex Farell-Davey
 Mr Gay NZ Contestants - Question Time
 Emily Kopp (USA)
 Ashley Tonga
 Vallkyrie
 Family Bar Showcase
 Annie Crummer
 Fine Fatale
 Lavina Williams
 Luke Bird
 People Like Us (Musical Showcase)
 Samantha Jade (AUS)
 Cindy of Samoa 

Prime Minister John Key made his annual appearance at the 2016 Big Gay Out, but was booed off stage by anti-Trans Pacific Partnership protesters. Despite the group of roughly 30 protesters, John Key received positive feedback for his attendance at the festival. An estimate of 10,000 people attended the 14 February 2016 Big Gay Out.

Ending HIV Big gay out 2017 
The 12 February 2017 Big Gay Out had performances spanning from 12:00pm until 7:00pm, including:
 Openside
 Cindy of Samoa
 Parson James
 Ahakoa Te Aha
 Jimmy Moore & Cas.D
 Tuhoi Henry
 Lavina Williams
 The Pop Tarts
 Charlotte Yates
 The Diamonds
 ANJI

Ending HIV Big gay out 2018 
For the first time in Big gay out history, the 11 February 2018 Big Gay Out was cancelled due to severe weather conditions.

Ending HIV Big gay out 2019 
The 10 February 2019 Big Gay Out had performances spanning from 12:00pm until 7:00pm, including:
 Golfweather
 Openside
 Jon Lemmon
 Julia Clement
 LEXXA
 The Miltones
 Auckland Philharmonia Orchestra
 White Chapel Jak
 Burundian Drummers
 Beth Goulstone
 Iris G
 Ahakoa Te Aha

Ending HIV Big gay out 2020 

The 9 February 2020 Big Gay Out had performances spanning from 12:00pm until 7:00pm, including:
Mika Haka
Courtney Act
Fortunes
Alae
Lizzie Marvelly
Randa
Hugo Grrrl
Medulla Oblongata
Kita Mean & Anita Wigl'it
Trinity Ice

Ending HIV Big gay out 2021 
The 14 February 2021 Big Gay Out had performances spanning from 12:00pm until 7:00pm, including:
Chelsea Jade
Possum Plows + Maude Morris
Half Queen + Coven
Jordan Eskra
Theia
Paige
Lady Shaka
Jazo
Kirsty Sutherland
Nicola Tims
Marjorie Sinclair
Native Bush

An estimate of 12,000 - 15,000 people attended. Half way through the event it was announced that three cases of Covid 19 were spread in the community in South Auckland, however, it was announced that Big gay out would still continue. The following day Auckland went into a three day lockdown.

Ending HIV Big gay out 2022 
On the 19th of January 2022, it was announced that for the second time in Big gay out history, the event will be cancelled. This is due to the uncertainty of Covid 19 and the omicron variant. If the event had happened, the event would have been headlined by Ladyhawke, Kita Mean, Anita Wigl'it and more.

Health promotion 
The New Zealand AIDS Foundation's Get it on! program uses the Big Gay Out festival as an avenue to promote safe sex and develop condom culture in New Zealand. A survey administered during the 2012 Big Gay Out festival determined that those who stayed longer were more knowledgeable and positive toward condom culture and felt that the Get it on! message was an empowering one. Survey participants also said the program "helped to educate men about safe sex" and "helped them feel good about having safe sex."   In 2014, Get It On! was dropped and LYC was adopted as the main message. Love Your Condom (LYC) is New Zealand Aids Foundation’s social marketing programme for gay and bisexual men. It addresses a complex mix of attitudinal, behavioural and social change amongst a community that can be difficult to define and reach. The LYC Social Marketing team talks about the programme’s history, the challenges they face and what keeps them loving what they do. In 2017, New Zealand Aids Foundation dropped Love Your Condom and created a new campaign called Ending HIV. It has a goal of ending new HIV transmission in New Zealand by 2025. The campaign highlight key points including: 
 Playing safe. Which means safe sex with the use of condoms and taking PrEP.
 Testing Often. Most HIV transmissions happen with people who do not know they have HIV and have unprotected sex. Testing often will diagnose people with HIV and get them onto treatment which will help stop spreading HIV.
 Treat Early. Treating early not only protects personal health, but it also reduces the chance of transmitting HIV to another person.
 Ending HIV Stigma. Stigma refers to prejudice and discrimination towards people living with HIV, their friends, partners and whānau. Even though HIV stigma was at its peak during the early days of the AIDS epidemic, many people living with HIV still experience prejudice on a daily basis.

References

External links
 Get it On - Big Gay Out 2010 official website

Festivals in Auckland
LGBT events in New Zealand
LGBT music festivals